Cheung Wai Ki (born 22 January 1990) is a Hong Kong football player who played as a midfielder for Citizen in the Hong Kong Women League and for Brisbane Roar in the Australian W-League. She also represents Hong Kong internationally in football and in futsal.

Club career

Citizen
After being in the Hong Kong Rangers youth system, Cheung helped Citizen win their 3rd Hong Kong Women League title in the 2014–15 season, and was the league's top scorer with 31 goals.

Brisbane Roar
In September 2017, Cheung signed a one-year deal with Brisbane Roar for the 2017–18 W-League season. She made her debut in the first round, playing the full match in a 3–1 victory over Sydney FC and providing the cross for Brisbane Roar's second goal of the match. In her second match, on 5 November 2017, she was involved in Brisbane Roar's only goal in a 4–1 loss to Perth Glory, but in the end the goal was officially credited to Clare Polkinghorne who headed it after it came off Cheung's back. At the end her contract, after playing 10 matches, Cheung was not re-signed by Brisbane Roar and left the club.

International career

Football
In August 2009, Cheung played for Hong Kong in the Semi-Final competition of the 2010 EAFF Women's Football Championship. She started in the 8–1 loss to Chinese Taipei and the 10–0 victory over Northern Mariana Islands, scoring a brace against the latter. She was then brought on as a substitute in the 7–0 loss to South Korea and started in 1–0 victory over Guam.

In July 2012, Cheung played for Hong Kong in the 1st preliminary round of the 2013 EAFF Women's East Asian Cup in the 11–0 victory over Northern Mariana Islands and in the 4–3 victory over Guam, scoring the first goal of the match against the latter. At the conclusion of the round she won the Most Valuable Player award for the round. Four months later, she played for Hong Kong in the 2nd preliminary round of the tournament in the 6–0, 4–0, and 2–1 losses to China, Australia, and Chinese Taipei respectively.

In May 2013, Cheung played in Hong Kong's squad for the 2014 AFC Women's Asian Cup qualification tournament. She scored both goals in Hong Kong's 2–1 victory over Kyrgyzstan and was named player of the match. She also scored a goal in the 3–1 victory over Bahrain and scored an own goal in the 4–0 loss to Vietnam.

In November 2014, Cheung played for Hong Kong in the 2nd preliminary round of the 2015 EAFF Women's East Asian Cup, starting all 3 matches which Hong Kong lost 2–0 to Chinese Taipei, 9–0 to South Korea and beat Guam 3–0.

Cheung was in Hong Kong's squad to compete in the football at the 2014 Asian Games.

In November 2016, Cheung was selected for Hong Kong's squad in the 2nd preliminary round of the 2017 EAFF E-1 Football Championship. She played in the 5–0 loss to Chinese Taipei and in the 14–0 loss to South Korea, scoring an own goal against the latter. She also played and scored the only goal in the 1–0 victory over Guam.

In April 2017, Cheung played in Hong Kong's squad for the 2018 AFC Women's Asian Cup qualification tournament. She scored the only goal for Hong Kong in the group, in the 2–1 loss to Uzbekistan. She also started for Hong Kong in the 5–0 loss to North Korea, in the 6–0 loss to South Korea, and in the 2–0 loss to India.

In November 2018, Cheung represented Hong Kong in the first round of the 2020 AFC Women's Olympic Qualifying Tournament. She scored Hong Kong's first goal in the 4–0 victory over Lebanon and started in the 1–1 draw with Iran. In both matches she was the player of the match.

In December 2018, Cheung was selected for Hong Kong's squad in the 2nd preliminary round of the 2019 EAFF E-1 Football Championship. She started in the 2–0 loss to Chinese Taipei, in the 6–0 loss to China, and in  the 3–0 victory over Mongolia, in which she scored the last goal which was considered one of the nicest of the tournament.

In April 2019, Cheung represented Hong Kong in the second round of the 2020 AFC Women's Olympic Qualifying Tournament. She started for Hong Kong in the 0–0 draw with Jordan, in the 2–1 loss to Vietnam, and in the 5–1 loss to Uzbekistan scoring Hong Kong's only goal in the match.

In February 2020, Cheung was called up for Hong Kong's squad for the 2020 Turkish Women's Cup. She played in the 4–1 loss to Romania.

Futsal
In June 2013, Cheung represented Hong Kong in futsal at the 2013 Asian Indoor and Martial Arts Games. She scored Hong Kong's only goal in the 2–1 loss to Vietnam and a brace in the 6–4 victory over Malaysia. She also played in the 5–1 loss to Thailand and the 6–0 loss to Iran.

In September 2017, Cheung represented Hong Kong in futsal at the 2017 Asian Indoor and Martial Arts Games. She played in the 6–1 victory over Turkmenistan, scored both goals in the 3–2 loss to Japan, and played in the 5–1 loss to China.

In May 2018, Cheung represented Hong Kong at the 2018 AFC Women's Futsal Championship and was named one of the five star players to look out for prior to the beginning of the tournament. She played in the 2–0 loss to Indonesia, scored 2 goals in the 7–0 victory over Macau, and played in the 8–0 loss to Thailand.

Career statistics

International goals
Scores and results list Hong Kong's goal tally first, score column indicates score after each Cheung goal.

See also
List of Hong Kong women's international footballers

References

External links
 
 

1990 births
Living people
Women's association football midfielders
Hong Kong women's footballers
Hong Kong women's international footballers
Asian Games competitors for Hong Kong
Footballers at the 2014 Asian Games
Footballers at the 2018 Asian Games
A-League Women players
Brisbane Roar FC (A-League Women) players
Hong Kong expatriate footballers
Hong Kong expatriates in Australia
Chinese expatriate sportspeople in Australia
Expatriate women's soccer players in Australia
Hong Kong women's futsal players